Álbum de la Revolución Cubana is a publication on the history of the Cuban Revolution. It consists of two parts: comic book and music CD.

Álbum de la Revolución Cubana Comic Trading Card

This comic book is released circa 1960s.

The stamps in the book are about the actors and events from the Cuban Revolution

Álbum de la Revolución Cubana Music

This album is released in 2000 by Cuba Soul. It consists of fifteen Cuban propaganda songs in a danceable Latin rhythm, including the famous song from Carlos Puebla, "Hasta siempre", written after Che Guevara's departure to Bolivia. 

Celeste Mendoza – Cuba corazón de nuestra América
Celina González y Reutilio – Décimas de la Revolución
Esther Borja – Despertar
Merceditas Valdés – A coger la guampara
Celina González y Reutilio – Que viva Fidel
Las D'aida – El cohete americano
Pío Leyva – Rumba de mi patria
Carlos Puebla – Hasta siempre
Amelita Frades – Pensamiento
Ramón Veloz – Nueva vida
Esther Borja – Dejame estrechar tu mano
Ojedita Y Coro – La canción de los niños
Niño Rivera – Nuevo son
Omara Portuondo – Junto a mi fusil mi son
Ela Calvo y Orquesta Aragón with Los Papines – Cuba, qué linda es Cuba

External links
Scanned Copy of the Comic trading card

2000 compilation albums
Compilation albums by Cuban artists